Juho Annala, born  is a Finnish racing driver.

Annala was born in Lapua. After starting in karting, he moved to Swedish, Finnish, and Nordic Formula Ford in 2004, winning the Nordic championship and coming second in both the Swedish and Finnish championships. In 2005 he moved to the British Formula Three Championship driving for Alan Docking Racing in the national class of the championship. He finished 6th in series points scoring 3 podium finishes. In 2006 he switched teams to Performance Racing Europe and captured 3 wins and 3 pole positions on his way to third in the championship. In 2007 he drove in the International Formula Master series for Jenzer Motorsport and finished 11th in points with a runner up finish at Brno. He drove in the 2008 Grand Prix of Long Beach, the final Champ Car race, for Rocketsports but was knocked out by mechanical problems after 42 laps after qualifying last. Later in the year he made two starts in the Finnish Super Touring Championship.

IndyCar

¹ Run on same day.
² Non-points-paying, exhibition race.

References

External links

1984 births
People from Lapua
British Formula Three Championship drivers
Champ Car drivers
Finnish racing drivers
Living people
International Formula Master drivers
Sportspeople from South Ostrobothnia

IndyCar Series drivers
Performance Racing drivers
Rocketsports Racing drivers
Alan Docking Racing drivers
Jenzer Motorsport drivers